Park No-bong (Korean: 박노봉; born June 19, 1961 in South Korea) is a South Korean former footballer who played as a defender.

He started his professional career at Daewoo Royals  in 1985.

He was winner of K League Best XI in 1986 K League.

References

External links 
 

1961 births
Living people
Association football defenders
Busan IPark players
South Korean footballers
Korea University alumni